Carlos Armando Samour Jr. is an associate justice of the Colorado Supreme Court and former chief judge for the Eighteenth Judicial District Court in Colorado.  He is known for serving as the judge for the trial of James Eagan Holmes, the convicted perpetrator of the 2012 Aurora, Colorado shooting.

Early life
Samour was born in El Salvador, and came to the United States in 1979 when he was 13 years old. His family fled El Salvador due to the civil war that was occurring. He graduated from Columbine High School in 1983. Samour received his Bachelor of Arts in psychology from the University of Colorado at Denver. He was awarded his Juris Doctor from the University of Denver.

Career
Samour served as a deputy district attorney in Denver, Colorado, for ten years. He also previously practiced law with the firm of Holland & Hart. He began his legal career serving for one year as a law clerk for former Judge Robert McWilliams of the United States Court of Appeals for the Tenth Circuit. He was appointed to the court in 2006 and took office in 2007. Samour was retained to the Eighteenth Judicial District Court for a six-year term, winning 62.18 percent of the vote.

Samour served as judge on the trial for James Eagan Holmes, the convicted perpetrator of the 2012 Aurora, Colorado shooting, in which 12 people were killed and 70 others were injured at a movie theater. The trial began on April 27, 2015. While the trial was initially expected to last for about four or five months, Samour stated in June that his goal was to have a verdict and sentencing by July and August. Since the trial started, Samour dismissed five jurors. On July 16, 2015, Holmes was found guilty of all charges.

Service on the Colorado Supreme Court 
On May 31, 2018 Colorado Governor John Hickenlooper appointed Carlos Samour as an associate justice on the Colorado Supreme Court. He later won a ten-year term in 2020.

References

External links

Living people
Year of birth missing (living people)
Colorado lawyers
Colorado state court judges
Justices of the Colorado Supreme Court
District attorneys in Colorado
Salvadoran emigrants to the United States
Salvadoran people of Palestinian descent
University of Colorado alumni
Sturm College of Law alumni